A sprue may refer to:

Sprue (manufacturing), a feature in molding and casting molds
Coeliac disease, also known as sprue, a disease of the small intestine
Tropical sprue, disease
Sprue Asparagus, first pickings of asparagus